Ximenkou Station is a subway station on Line 1 of the Ningbo Rail Transit that started operations on 30May 2014. It is situated under Zhongshan Road in Haishu District of Ningbo City, Zhejiang Province, eastern China.

Exits

Around the station
 Yuehu Mosque

References

Railway stations in Zhejiang
Railway stations in China opened in 2014
Ningbo Rail Transit stations